Megachile colorata is a species of bee in the family Megachilidae. It was described by Fox in 1896.

References

Colorata
Insects described in 1896